Sacred Heart Model School, also known as SHMS, is a coeducational Catholic school for children from Junior Kindergarten through Eighth Grade. It is located in Louisville, Kentucky, and is sponsored by the Ursuline Nuns of the Immaculate Conception. Their current principal is Dr. Michael Bratcher and the president is Dr. Cynthia Crabtree. In both 2001 and 2018 Sacred Heart Model School received the Blue Ribbon School of Excellence award. They have a variety of sports teams and clubs as well as an immense focus on their teachings of faith and service. On the same campus is Sacred Heart Academy (SHA), a high school for girls, Sacred Heart School for the Arts (SHSA), and Sacred Heart Preschool (SHP). Sacred Heart Model School can be found at 3107 Lexington Road, 40206-3061. The phone number is (502) 896-3932.

History 
The original land in which the Sacred Heart Campus resides was purchases in 1877 by the Ursuline Sisters. The original building for the all girls high school, Sacred Heart Academy, was first built in 1904 by an architect named Cornelius Curtin. After the fire burned down this school in 1918, a new building was constructed and Sacred Heart Academy reopened in 1926. Sacred Heart Model School was founded in 1924, and initially was placed in Angela Hall. SHMS was moved in 1999 to the SHA building from 1926.

Faith

Core Values 
The Ursuline Sisters who founded Sacred Heart Model School practiced the Catholic Faith using their Core Values of Community, Reverence, Service, and Leadership. These Core Values are incorporated into the daily lives of all students, no matter what faith each student practices, from Kindergarten through Eighth Grade.

Service Learning 
Sacred Heart Model School uses their own original student stewardship program to teach students the importance of service learning. "Students Helping Many Succeed" pertains to each grade level and gives each one a specific community group in need to change the lives of. The students will complete stewardship projects in each grade. One example of a stewardship project at SHMS is Level Four's focus of supporting community members who are visually impaired.

Athletics 
As this is a Catholic school, SHMS takes into account not only the physical aspects of their student-athletes, but also the emotional and spiritual aspects as well. All students from Kindergarten to Eighth grade may participate in any of the sports offered by SHMS. The boys have the options of Basketball, Cross Country, Flag Football, Golf, Lacrosse, Soccer, Swimming, Tackle Football, Tennis, Track, and Volleyball. The girls have the options of Basketball, Cross Country, Field Hockey, Golf, Lacrosse, Soccer, Swimming, Tennis, Track, and Volleyball. There is one coed option and that is Coed Soccer in which the boys and girls may play together.

Clubs and Extracurriculars 
Sacred Heart Model School believes the involvement of clubs and other activities is beneficial in learning leadership and how to work with their classmates and teachers. The extensive list of extracurriculars includes: Board Game Club, Bocce Ball, Book Ball, Book Bee, Chess Club, Coding Club, Computer Science Club, Cooking Club, Data Team, French Scrabble, Green Team, Geography Bee, Governor's Cup, HSTP Prep Club, Juggling Club, KYA, KUNA, Legion of Mary, Lego Robotics, Quick Recall, Rosary Club, Sketch Club, Spanish Club, STEM Club, Student Advisory, and Technology Leadership Club.

References

External links
 Official website
https://louisvillecatholicschools.com/schools/sacred-heart-model-school/
https://books.google.com/books?hl=en&lr=&id=ZzekHG5C6VEC&oi=fnd&pg=PA6&dq=Louisville%27s+crescent+hill&ots=zfbtzDvKv1&sig=yA2lkWtXksUpXmFvhEy6YMcqyes#v=onepage&q&f=false
https://shms.shslou.org/apps/pages/student-life/faith-and-service
https://shms.shslou.org/apps/pages/student-life/athletics
https://shms.shslou.org/apps/pages/student-life/clubs-and-activities

Private middle schools in Kentucky
Private elementary schools in Kentucky
Roman Catholic schools in Louisville, Kentucky
Catholic elementary schools in Kentucky